Louis Tylka (born May 26, 1970) is an American prelate of the Roman Catholic Church who became bishop of the Diocese of Peoria in Illinois in 2022 after 18 months as coadjutor bishop there.

Biography

Early life 
Louis Tylka was born on May 26, 1970, in Harvey, Illinois, to Louis and Norma Tylka. He has five older sisters. The family moved to Hazel Crest, Illinois. Tylka was educated at St. Joseph Grammar School in Homewood, Illinois, and Marian Catholic High School in Chicago Heights, Illinois. After a year at Purdue University in West Lafayette, Indiana,, Tylka transferred to Niles College Seminary of Loyola University Chicago.  He then studied for the priesthood at University of Saint Mary of the Lake in Mundelein, Illinois.

Priesthood 
On May 18, 1996, Tylka was ordained a priest for the Archdiocese of Chicago by Cardinal Joseph Bernardin. After his ordination, Tylka served as associate pastor at St. Michael Parish in Orland Park, Illinois, from 1996 to 2003 and at Saints Faith, Hope, and Charity Parish in Winnetka, Illinois, from 2003 to 2004. Tylka was appointed pastor of St. Paul VI Parish in North Riverside, Illinois in 2004 and then St. Julie Billiart Parish in Tinley Park, Illinois, in 2014. Tylka served on the priests council for the archdiocese and was its chairman from 2015 to 2020.

Bishop of Peoria 
Pope Francis appointed Tylka as coadjutor bishop for the Diocese of Peoria on May 11, 2020. Peoria's Bishop Daniel Jenky had asked for the appointment of a coadjutor because of health problems. Tylka was consecrated at the Cathedral of Saint Mary of the Immaculate Conception in Peoria by Cardinal Blase Cupich on July 23, 2020, with Archbishop Christophe Pierre and Bishop Jerome Listecki as co-consecrators.

On August 25, 2021, Tylka said that Archbishop Fulton J. Sheen, who served as a priest in Peoria, should be canonized (made a saint). Sheen was due to be beatified in 2019, but Bishop Salvatore Matano had requested a pause in the process.  

When Jenky's retirement was accepted by Pope Francis on March 3, 2022, Tylka automatically became the new bishop of the Diocese of Peoria.

See also

 Catholic Church hierarchy
 Catholic Church in the United States
 Historical list of the Catholic bishops of the United States
 List of Catholic bishops of the United States
 Lists of patriarchs, archbishops, and bishops

Notes

References

External links

 Roman Catholic Diocese of Peoria Official Site
 Roman Catholic Archdiocese of Chicago Official Site

 
 

1970 births
Living people
People from Harvey, Illinois
University of Saint Mary of the Lake alumni
Roman Catholic Archdiocese of Chicago
Roman Catholic Diocese of Peoria
21st-century Roman Catholic bishops in the United States
Bishops appointed by Pope Francis